Gerville is a commune in the Seine-Maritime department in the Normandy region in northern France.

Geography
The commune comprises 6 hamlets or place-names: La Mare Chanseuse, Le Bihorel, La Hêtrée, Le Parlement, Le Beau Soleil and Vue-du-Coquet

Heraldry

Population

Places of interest

 The church of St.Michel, dating from the nineteenth century.
 The remains of a 19th-century chateau, destroyed by fire in 1944.

See also
Communes of the Seine-Maritime department

References

Communes of Seine-Maritime